Etlingera coccinea is a monocotyledonous plant species that was first described by Carl Ludwig von Blume, and given its current name by S. Sakai and Hidetoshi Nagamasu. Etlingera coccinea is part of the genus Etlingera and the family Zingiberaceae. No subspecies are listed in the Catalog of Life.

References 

coccinea